The Rauðhólar are remnants of a cluster of rootless cones in Elliðaárhraun  lava fields on the south-eastern outskirts of Reykjavík, Iceland next to the South Iceland part of Hringvegur, the Suðurlandsvegur.

Name
The name Rauðhólar means “Red Mounds”. It refers to the reddish color of their rocks due to iron oxidations.

Some other volcanic cone groups in Iceland also bear the name of Rauðhólar (see eg. Rauðhólar (Vesturdalur)).

Geography
The cone group is situated not far from Reykjavík’s district of Norðlingaholt  and between the Hringvegur and the lake Elliðavatn. Sometimes the rootless cone group is also called Rauðhólar við/near Elliðavatn.

The cones are placed directly over the connected lava flow, in this case the Elliðaárhraun, which has a width of about 2 km and a length of about 27 km. Scientists to the beginning of the 20th century counted 150 cones. “The largest cone of the group had a width of 212 m and rose 22 m above the surrounding lava surface.”.

Geology
These rootless cones, also called pseudocraters, are part of the Leitahraun lava, lava flows from a shield volcano up on Hellisheiði. This shield volcano, Leitin, is part of the Brennisteinsfjöll volcanic system. The resp. lava flow, a branch of the Leitahraun, is called Elliðaárhraun and was emitted by the shield volcano about 5000 years ago.

The Rauðhólar built up on a location where lava flows entered and covered a small lake just north of today’s Elliðavatn.

The stratigraphy shows a mudstone bed (the lake bottom before-eruption), a 7 m high lava flow and a 5 m high scoria platform.

Formation of the rootless cones 
"When lava flows over shallow lakes, marshland or in river channels pseudocraters are formed." The heat of the lava causes expansion and boiling,  the water content is changed into steam and this initiates hydromagmatic explosions “This often leads to the formation of very regularly shaped scoria craters“. The cones are fed laterally, from feeders which actually are lava tubes of advancing pāhoehoe flows.

In this way, these craters have no direct connection with a magma reservoir in the Earth's crust,  thence the denomination as rootless cones.

The internal stratigraphy of the cones shows the different phases of the eruption: “They are typically stratified (formed by multiple eruptive events), inversely size graded (showing decreasing explosivity with time), and capped with welded spatter (indicating cessation of explosivity due to volatile depletion).” Some cones have more than one crater.

Grouping of the rootless cones
They are arranged in irregular groups. The volcanologist Thor Thordarson and other scientists have researched these arrangements which they do not think to be only random.

The results show that most of the craters have a tendency to build lines or groups, are to be found at a short distance of the next one, if they not even overlap. This is proposedly due to “the underlying lava pathway geometry and/or by the substrate hydrology”, i.e. the form of the lava pathway resp. the water content of the sediments below the lava.

Other rootless cone groups in Iceland
Rootless cone groups are not seldom to be found in Iceland. Other well known rootless cone groups in Iceland are e.g. the Landbrotshólar in the Eldgjáhraun lava field near Kirkjubæjarklaustur, the Álftaversgígar on Mýrdalssandur and last but not least the Skútustaðagígar at lake Mývatn in North Iceland.

It seems that the phenomenon is rarely to be found on Earth, esp. existing in Iceland. But since some years, scientists are looking for them at Mars, they could be a sign of the existence of water on the harsh planet.

Quarry
Originally there were over 100 craters, but the gravel from them was taken and used for construction. Most of the material was removed  around World War II and used for projects such as Reykjavík Airport and road building.

Nature protection
Today, Rauðhólar are protected as part of Reykjavík's nature reserve of Heiðmörk.

See also
 Heiðmörk
 Elliðavatn
 Rauðhólar (Vesturdalur)

Sources
 Big Map of Reykjavik. 2007 - 2008 / Iceland Road Atlas.

References

Geography of Reykjavík
Reykjanes Volcanic Belt
Brennisteinsfjöll Volcanic System